Arnould is a given name and surname. Notable people with the name include:

Surname
Derek Clement Arnould, former Canadian diplomat
Dominique Arnould (born 1966), former professional road, cyclo-cross, and mountain bike cyclist
Isabelle Arnould (born 1970), retired female freestyle swimmer from Belgium
Jeanne Sylvanie Arnould-Plessy (1819–1897), French stage actress
Joseph Arnould (1813–1886), British judge in India and writer
Kevin Arnould (born 1980), French Nordic combined skier who competed from 2000 to 2006
Rita Arnould (died 1943), courier of the Red Orchestra resistance group in Belgium
Robert Arnould (born 1953), American politician
Roger-Arnould Rivière (1930–1959), French poet
Sophie Arnould (1740–1802), French operatic soprano

Given name
Arnould de Vuez (1644–1720), painter of Flemish origin active in Lille from 1695 to 1720
Arnould Galopin (1865–1934), prolific French writer with more than 50 novels to his credit